This page lists the winners and nominees for the Soul Train Music Heritage Award for Career Achievement, awarded from 1987 to 1997. The award was later retitled in 1998 to the Quincy Jones Award for Career Achievement.

Winners
Winners are listed first and highlighted in bold.

1980s

1990s

See also
 Soul Train Music Award for Quincy Jones Award for Career Achievement

References

Soul Train Music Awards